The 1971 Dutch Open was a combined men's and women's tennis tournament staged in Hilversum, Netherlands. It was a non–tour event, i.e. not part of one of the main tennis circuits, the Grand Prix or World Championship Tennis circuit. The tournament was played on outdoor clay courts and was held from 26 July through 1 August 1971. It was the 15th edition of the tournament and was part of the 1971 Grand Prix circuit. Gerald Battrick and Evonne Goolagong won the singles titles.

Finals

Men's singles
 Gerald Battrick defeated  Ross Case 6–3, 6–4, 9–7

Women's singles
 Evonne Goolagong defeated  Christina Sandberg 8–6, 6–3

Men's doubles
 Jean-Claude Barclay /  Daniel Contet defeated  John Cooper /  Colin Dibley 7–5, 3–6, 7–5, 4–6, 6–2

Women's doubles
 Betty Stöve /  Christina Sandberg defeated  Katja Ebbinghaus /  Trudy Walhof 6–1, 6–2

Mixed doubles
 Betty Stöve /  Jean-Claude Barclay defeated  Christina Sandberg /  Patrice Dominguez 8–6, 6–3

References

Dutch Open (tennis)
Dutch Open
Dutch Open
Dutch Open
Dutch Open (tennis), 1971